Achaeridion is a monotypic genus of comb-footed spiders containing the single species, Achaeridion conigerum. It was first described by J. Wunderlich in 2008, and is found in Europe.

See also
 List of Theridiidae species

References

Monotypic Araneomorphae genera
Spiders of Russia
Theridiidae